Gymnotocinclus canoeiro is a species of catfish in the family Loricariidae. It is native to South America, where it occurs in the Tocantins River basin in Brazil. The species reaches at least 6.2 cm (2.4 inches) in standard length. It was described in 2017 by Fábio F. Roxo (of São Paulo State University), Gabriel S. C. Silva (also of São Paulo State University), Luz Eneida Ochoa (of the University of São Paulo), and Cláudio Henrique Zawadzki (of the State University of Maringá). Its specific name, canoeiro, refers to the Avá-Canoeiro people, speakers of the Avá-Canoeiro language, who inhabit the upper Tocantins basin.

References 

Fish described in 2017
Catfish of South America
Fish of Brazil
Loricariidae